National Highway 162 (NH 162) is a  National Highway in India. It is a spur road of National Highway 62. NH-162 traverses the state of Rajasthan in India. NH162 route was extended from Pali to Bhatewar.

Route 
Bar,Sojat City, Pali, Marwad, Nadol, Desuri, Kumbalgarh, Haldighati, Nathdwara, Mavli, Bhatewar.

Junctions  

  Terminal near Bar.
  near Pali.
  Terminal near Bhatewar.

See also 

 List of National Highways in India by highway number
 List of National Highways in India by state

References

External links 

 NH 162 on OpenStreetMap
 NH 162 Ext on OpenStreetMap

National highways in India
National Highways in Rajasthan